The Light of Kailasa is a Hindu movement originally from Belarus. It is a part of the Saivite movement. It was banned by government authorities in Belarus. 

In 2002, the main activists of the movement — Tatiana Akadanova (now in USA as refugee), Sergei Akadanov (now in USA as refugee) and Sergei Olisevich — were sentenced to prison terms. Hindu activists Sergei Romanchik, Tatiana Zhilevich, Sergei Silybins, Irina Silybins, Igor Yusupov and Irina Golovina were also imprisoned. In 2003 group leader Natalya Solovyova and other followers were attacked by police. Many of the followers were imprisoned, while the rest fled to USA and other countries. Now there is no organized activity of this movement in Belarus.

See also

 Belarus Hinduism
 Persecution of Hindus

References

External links
 
 Hunger Strike for Belarus Hindu Persecution, Hindu Net

Belarusian culture
Hinduism in Belarus
Hindu organizations based in Belarus